Jorge Pulido Mayoral (born 8 April 1991) is a Spanish professional footballer who plays as a central defender for SD Huesca.

Club career

Atlético Madrid
Born in Castillo de Bayuela, Castile-La Mancha, Pulido arrived in Atlético Madrid's youth system at the age of 10. He made his senior debut in the 2009–10 season, appearing with their reserves in the Segunda División B.

Pulido made his official debut with the Colchoneros first team on 10 November 2010, playing the entire 1–1 home draw against Universidad de Las Palmas CF in the round of 32 of the Copa del Rey (6–1 aggregate win). On 18 February of the following year, he extended his contract with the club by signing until 2014.

On 15 May 2011, benefitting from injuries to Diego Godín and Luis Perea and the suspension of Tomáš Ujfaluši, Pulido made his first La Liga appearance, playing the full 90 minutes – with a good overall performance – and being booked after committing a penalty in a 2–1 home victory over Hércules CF, as the team finally qualified to the UEFA Europa League. On 27 January 2012, he was loaned to fellow league side Rayo Vallecano until June.

Castilla and Albacete
After being a regular starter with Rayo, Pulido returned to Atlético in the summer of 2012, but after being again underplayed he moved across the city to Real Madrid on 19 July 2013, being assigned to the reserves in Segunda División. After suffering relegation with the latter he was released, subsequently joining Albacete Balompié also in that tier.

Pulido scored his first professional goal on 25 January 2015, his team's second in a 3–2 win at AD Alcorcón.

Sint-Truiden
In June 2016, after Albacete's relegation, Pulido moved abroad for the first time to Sint-Truidense V.V. of Belgium on a three-year deal. In the third game of the season, he was sent off in a goalless draw with R.S.C. Anderlecht for a foul on Trézéguet, earning him a two-match ban and €800 fine.

Huesca
After only one year abroad, Pulido was back in Spain's second tier on 6 July 2017 on a two-year contract at SD Huesca. He played all bar three matches as the Aragonese reached the top flight for the first time, scoring in the 2–0 away defeat of CD Lugo on 21 May 2018 that confirmed it.

The team was immediately relegated, and Pulido was sent off in his last two appearances of the campaign. In late January 2019, he agreed to a three-year extension at the Estadio El Alcoraz.

In 2019–20, Pulido captained Huesca to the second division title. He wore a new armband design in every away game to honour the host city, such as a guitar at Cádiz CF.

International career
Pulido participated in the 2008 UEFA European Under-17 Championship with Spain, helping his country to eventual victory in the tournament and scoring two goals.

Honours
Atlético Madrid
Copa del Rey: 2012–13

Huesca
Segunda División: 2019–20

Spain U17
UEFA European Under-17 Championship: 2008

Spain U19
UEFA European Under-19 Championship runner-up: 2010

References

External links

1991 births
Living people
Sportspeople from the Province of Toledo
Spanish footballers
Footballers from Castilla–La Mancha
Association football defenders
La Liga players
Segunda División players
Segunda División B players
Atlético Madrid B players
Atlético Madrid footballers
Rayo Vallecano players
Real Madrid Castilla footballers
Albacete Balompié players
SD Huesca footballers
Belgian Pro League players
Sint-Truidense V.V. players
Spain youth international footballers
Spanish expatriate footballers
Expatriate footballers in Belgium
Spanish expatriate sportspeople in Belgium